Huawen Group is a publicly listed Chinese holding company in the media sector. It is one of the 500 components of the SZSE Component Index, as well as the sub-index SZSE 300 Index and SZSE 100 Index.

Acquisitions
In 2006, the company acquired the commercial brokerage rights of the Securities Times (a newspaper under state-owned People's Daily) for 30 years.

In 2016, Huawen Media Investment subscribed the new shares of China International Broadcasting Network. After the deal, Huawen Media owned a 30.9996% stake, while Global Broadcasting Media Group owned a 34% stake and was the largest shareholder. Global Broadcasting Media Group was also the indirect major shareholder of Huawen Media Investment.

Shareholders
Global Broadcasting Asset Management is a subsidiary (58.0344%) of Global Broadcasting Media Group. Global Broadcasting Media Group is a joint venture (50–50) of state-owned broadcasting company China Radio International with a private company.

References

External links
  

Mass media companies of China
Companies listed on the Shenzhen Stock Exchange